Emilio Solanet (1887–1979) was an Argentine scientist.

Argentine scientists
Argentine veterinarians
Radical Civic Union politicians
Buenos Aires Province politicians
Vice Governors of Buenos Aires Province
1887 births
1979 deaths